Allison Brewster Franzetti is an American pianist and music educator, originally from New York City. She received a Bachelor of Music degree from the Manhattan School of Music, a Master of Music degree from the Juilliard School, and a Doctorate in Musical Arts from Mason Gross School of the Arts at Rutgers University.

She has been married to Carlos Franzetti since 1994 and they have one daughter, Mariana.

Discography
Mieczysław Weinberg: Complete Piano Works (Grand Piano 2012/2013)
Carlos Franzetti: Pierrot et Colombine (Sunnyside, 2012)
Carlos Franzetti: Alborada with the City of Prague Philharmonic (Amapola 2011)
Aaron Copland: Quiet City with Christopher Brellochs and Paul Cohen (Sono Luminus 2011)
Maurice Ravel: Ma Mere L'Oye, Valses nobles et sentimentales, Daphnis et Chloe Suite No. 2 (Amapola 2010)
Carlos Franzetti: Piano Concerto No. 1 and Symphony No. 2 (Amapola 2009)
20th Century Piano Sonatas: Berg, Hindemith, Schoenberg, Hartmann (Naxos, 2007)
Sonata Fantasy with Kimberly McCoul Risinger (Albany, 2007)
American Piano Volume 5: South American Landscapes (Premier, 2004)
Carlos Franzetti: Reflexiones (Amapola, 2004)
Tango Ballet: Poeta de Arrabal (Amapola, 2002)
Tango Bar (Chesky, 2001)
Tango Fatal (Amapola, 2001)
Roberto Sierra: El Mensajero de Plata  (Newport Classics, 1999)
Scriabin, Ravel, DeFalla (Amapola, 1999)
The Unknown Piazzolla  (Chesky, 1999)
Roberto Sierra: El Mensajero de Plata  (Newport Classics, 1999)
Carlos Franzetti: Piano Concerto No. 2 and Symphony No. 1 (Amapola, 1998)
Portraits of Cuba (Chesky, 1996)
Images Before Dawn - The Symphonic Music of Carlos Franzetti (Premier, 1995)

References

External links
Allison Brewster Franzetti's web page
Allison Brewster Franzetti on Chesky Records
 Allison Brewster Franzetti on Naxos
 Allison Brewster Franzetti at Mason Gross School of the Arts

Juilliard School alumni
Musicians from New York City
American women classical pianists
American classical pianists
Living people
Year of birth missing (living people)
Chesky Records artists
Classical musicians from New York (state)
21st-century classical pianists
21st-century American women pianists
21st-century American pianists
20th-century classical pianists
20th-century American women pianists
20th-century American pianists